The FIBT World Championships 1992 took place in Calgary, Alberta, Canada. This was Calgary's first time hosting a championship event. It was also an extraordinary event since men's skeleton was not included in the program of the 1992 Winter Olympics in Albertville, France.

Men's skeleton

, Sandford is the only person from the Southern Hemisphere to medal in bobsleigh, luge, or skeleton in a World Championship or Winter Olympic level.

Medal table

References
Men's skeleton World Champions

1992
1992 in Canadian sports
1992 in skeleton
1992 in bobsleigh
International sports competitions hosted by Canada
Bobsleigh in Canada